Cato Menkerud (born August 23, 1973 in Lillehammer, Norway) is a rally co-driver.  He started as a co-driver in 1992 for his father Helge Menkerud.  In addition to Henning Solberg, he has co-driven for Petter Solberg, Birger Gundersen, Thomas Kolberg, Alexander Foss and Henrik Lundgaard. After the 2009 World Rally Championship season Menkerud split from Henning Solberg, and became the co-driver for Eyvind Brynildsen.  In addition to being a co-driver he runs a gas station in Lillehammer, where he lives. He is married to Charlotte.

Achievements
 1997 – Gold in Norwegian Championship together with Birger Gundersen
 1998 – Silver in South Swedish Rally and Rally Lebanon
 2002 – Gold in South Swedish Rally
 2002 and 2003 – Gold in Norwegian Championship together with Henning Solberg

References

1973 births
Living people
Norwegian rally co-drivers
World Rally Championship co-drivers
Sportspeople from Lillehammer